Rachel Podger (born 1968 in England) is a British violinist and conductor specialising in the performance of Baroque music.

Career
Podger was born to a British father and a German mother. She was educated at a German Rudolf Steiner school then returned to study first with Perry Hart, then at the Guildhall School of Music and Drama with David Takeno, Pauline Scott, and Micaela Comberti. During her studies, she co-founded Baroque chamber groups The Palladian Ensemble and Florilegium, and worked with period instrument ensembles such as the New London Consort and London Baroque.

Podger often conducts Baroque orchestras from the violin. She was the leader of the Gabrieli Consort and Players and later of The English Concert from 1997 to 2002, touring extensively, often as soloist in Vivaldi's Le quattro stagioni and Grosso mogul concertos. In 2004 she took up guest directorship of the Orchestra of the Age of Enlightenment, opening with a tour in the United States with Bach's Brandenburg Concertos. She currently works as a guest director with Arte dei Suonatori (Poland), Musica Angelica and Santa Fe Pro Musica (both in the United States) and as soloist with The Academy of Ancient Music.

Podger is a professor of Baroque violin at both the Guildhall School of Music and Drama and the Royal Welsh College of Music and Drama and also teaches regularly at the Hochschule für Künste, Bremen. In September 2008, she took up the newly founded Micaela Comberti Chair for Baroque violin at the Royal Academy of Music in London and then became professor of Baroque violin at the Royal Danish Academy of Music in Copenhagen.

When not touring with various orchestras and other classical players, Podger works with her partner in Brecon, Mid-Wales, helping young musicians through the Mozart Music Fund, which she founded in 2006, as well as holding workshops and giving recitals. In 2006 they founded the annual Brecon Baroque Festival which is held over the penultimate weekend of October every year.

Instruments
Podger plays a violin made in Genoa in 1739 by Pesarinius, a later student of Antonio Stradivari. She initially played a Stradivarius copy from 1988 by Rowland Ross, and has recorded Haydn and Mozart on the 1699 Crespi Stradivarius.

Recordings
Podger records for Channel Classics Records.
Bach's complete sonatas and partitas for violin solo, complete volumes 1 and 2 (top recommendation in BBC Radio 3 "Building a Library")
Telemann's 12 fantasies for solo violin (1746)
Bach's complete sonatas for violin and harpsichord, with Trevor Pinnock
Purcell's sonatas in 3 parts, with Pavlo Beznosiuk and Christopher Hogwood
Bach's solo and double violin concertos, with Andrew Manze and The Academy of Ancient Music
Vivaldi's 12 La Stravaganza concertos, directing Arte dei Suonatori (won Gramophone magazine's Best Baroque Recording of 2003) available on CD, SACD and Studio Master
Mozart's complete sonatas for violin and fortepiano, with Gary Cooper, volumes 1–8
Rameau's Pieces de clavecin en concerts, with Trevor Pinnock and Jonathan Manson
Mozart and Haydn violin concertos, with the Orchestra of the Age of Enlightenment and Pavlo Beznosiuk on viola (available on CD, SACD and Studio Master)
Bach's solo violin concertos, with Brecon Baroque (2010)
Biber’s 16 Rosary Sonatas, with Jonathan Manson, David Miller, and Marcin Świątkiewicz (2015)
Vivaldi's 12 L'estro Armonico (Opus 3) concertos, directing Brecon Baroque (won Gramophone magazine's recording of the month for April 2015)
Bach’s Die Kunst Der Fuge, with Brecon Baroque (2017)
Vivaldi's Le quattro stagioni, complete with three other Vivaldi concerti: Il Riposo per Il S.S. Natale RV 270, Concerto L'Amoroso Rv 271, and Concerto Il Grosso Mogul Rv 208 (2018), which immediately received several high praise reviews. It reached #1 in the UK classical album chart.

References

Sources
BBC Radio 3, Profile: Rachel Podger , The Early Music Show, broadcast 27 April 2008. Accessed 8 May 2009.
James Reel, "Master of the Universe: In early music, violinist Rachel Podger found a second calling", Strings magazine, February 2005, No. 126.  Accessed 2012-03-12.

External links
Rachel Podger at Percius
Rachel's official website

1968 births
Living people
Academics of the Royal Academy of Music
Alumni of the Guildhall School of Music and Drama
Baroque-violin players
British performers of early music
Women performers of early music
British classical violinists
English people of German descent
Honorary Members of the Royal Academy of Music
Waldorf school alumni
Women conductors (music)
Winners of the Royal Academy of Music/ Kohn Foundation Bach Prize
21st-century conductors (music)
21st-century classical violinists
21st-century British musicians
21st-century British women musicians
20th-century conductors (music)
20th-century classical violinists
20th-century British musicians
20th-century British women musicians
Women classical violinists